Khimeh Gah may refer to:
 Khimeh Gah, Hamadan
 Khimeh Gah, Khuzestan